The Caspar CLE 16 was an airliner built in Germany in the early 1920s.

Development
Only one CLE 16 was built (registration D-294), and it took part in the International Air Exhibition in Gothenburg (Sweden) in July 1923.

Specifications

References

1920s German airliners